Ancistrus marcapatae is a species of catfish in the family Loricariidae. It is native to South America, where it occurs in the Inambari River basin, which is part of the Madeira River drainage in Peru. The species reaches 12.4 cm (4.9 inches) in total length.

References 

marcapatae
Fish described in 1904
Taxa named by Charles Tate Regan